Patrick A. McManus (October, 1859 – May 19, 1917) was a Major League Baseball pitcher during part of the 1879 season. He was a native of Ireland.

McManus started and completed two games for the Troy Trojans of the National League. He gave up just 25 baserunners (24 hits and 1 walk) in 21 innings.  He also gave up 21 runs, but only 7 of them were earned runs.

His first game was on May 22, 1879 against the Cleveland Blues at Kennard Street Park in Cleveland, Ohio. The Trojans lost, 10–8. His second and last game was August 13, 1879 against the Providence Grays at Putnam Grounds in Troy, New York. The Trojans lost, 11–3.

One of his teammates on the 1879 Trojans was Hall of Famer Dan Brouthers.

In McManus's short MLB career, he was 0–2 with 6 strikeouts, 1 walk, and an ERA of 3.00.

He died at the age of 57 in Mount Hope, New York.

External links

 Retrosheet

References 

Troy Trojans players
Major League Baseball pitchers
Major League Baseball players from Ireland
Irish baseball players
Irish emigrants to the United States (before 1923)
19th-century baseball players
1859 births
1917 deaths
Troy Haymakers players
Capital City of Albany players
Rochester Hop Bitters players
People from Mount Hope, New York
Baseball players from New York (state)